
The Nauo language, also commonly written Nawu, is an extinct and little-recorded Australian Aboriginal language that was spoken by the Nauo people on the southern part of the Eyre Peninsula, South Australia. However, work on the reconstruction of the language by the Mobile Language Team at Adelaide University is proceeding.

Classification
The Nauo language may have been related to the languages of its regional neighbours on the Eyre Peninsula, such as Barngarla or Wirangu.

Alternative names
Apart from Nawu, other variant spellings have been recorded as Nhawu, Nawo, Njao,  Gnowoo, Growoo, and variant names include Battara, Hilleri, Kadu, Kartwongulta, and Wiljaru. It has also been treated as a variant of the Wirangu language.

Status
The language was deemed to be extinct Norman Tindale, based on linguistic investigations done to determine Nauo's status in the 1930s, and no speakers have been recorded since 1975.
 
However,  Mobile Language Team (MLT) from the University of Adelaide has started work on the reconstruction of the language, based on the 10 words recorded by German missionary C. W. Schürmann, increasing the wordlist to 300 words. MLT is preparing a website for online learning site of the language.

References

External links
  Reproduced from Tindale's Aboriginal Tribes of Australia (1974).
 Includes inventory listings of holdings.

Thura-Yura languages
Extinct languages of South Australia
Languages extinct in the 19th century